Gradska (Cyrillic: Градска) is a village in Bosnia and Herzegovina.  The village is located in the municipality of Ljubuški.

Demographics 
According to the 2013 census, its population was 145.

References

Populated places in Ljubuški